PLA Naval University of Engineering (abbreviated NUEPLA and colloquially known by the Chinese as Haǐgōngdà 海工大), is a national key university administered by the People's Liberation Army Navy. PLA Naval University of Engineering is located in Wuhan, Hubei, China.

As of fall 2015, the university has 2 campuses, consists of 5 colleges and 7 departments, with 20 specialties for undergraduates.

History
PLA Naval University of Engineering was founded in May 1949, it was initially called "Andong Naval Academy". It was renamed "Dalian Naval Academy" in November 1949 and "PLA Second Naval Academy" in December 1950. In 1975, PLA Second Naval Academy was changed to PLA Naval Academy of Engineering. In 1999, PLA Naval Academy of Engineering and PLA Naval Academy of Electronic Engineering merged to form the PLA Naval University of Engineering. In 2004, PLA Naval Logistics Academy merged into the university.

Schools and Departments
 College of Science
 College of Power Engineering
 College of Electronic Engineering
 College of Electrical Engineering
 College of Service
 Department of Weapon System Engineering
 Department of Marine Engineering
 Department of Nuclear Science and Engineering
 Department of Information Security
 Department of Management Engineering
 Department of Equipment Economics & Management
 Department of Training

Culture
 Motto: 
 Official journal: Journal of Naval University of Engineering, founded in 1977.

Library
The PLA Naval University of Engineering Library has a collection of over 0.6 million volumes.

Notable alumni
 He You, an academician of the Chinese Academy of Engineering.
 Liang Yang, captain of Changzhou Warship.
 Lou Fuqiang, engineer commander of the Chinese aircraft carrier Liaoning.
 Ma Weiming, an academician of the Chinese Academy of Engineering.
 Wang Wencai, president of Tianjin Campuses, PLA Naval University of Engineering.
 Li Juelong, a professor at PLA University of Science and Technology and PLA Naval University of Engineering.

Friendly Schools
 Tsinghua University
 Huazhong University of Science and Technology

References

 
Educational institutions established in 1949
Military education and training in China
1949 establishments in China
Universities and colleges in Wuhan